Hamlet (Italian:Amleto) is a 1917 Italian silent drama film directed by Eleuterio Rodolfi and starring Ruggero Ruggeri, Helena Makowska and Mercedes Brignone. It is an adaptation of William Shakespeare's play Hamlet.

Cast
 Ruggero Ruggeri as Hamlet 
 Helena Makowska as Ophelia  
 Mercedes Brignone as Gertrude   
 Martelli as Claudius  
 Armand Pouget
 Gerardo Peña

See also
List of ghost films

References

Bibliography 
 Burnett, Mark Thornton & Streete, Adrian & Wray, Ramona (ed.) The Edinburgh Companion to Shakespeare and the Arts. Edinburgh University Press, 2011.

External links 
 

1910s historical drama films
Italian historical drama films
Italian silent feature films
1910s Italian-language films
Films directed by Eleuterio Rodolfi
Films based on Hamlet
1917 films
Italian black-and-white films
1917 drama films
Italian films based on plays
Silent drama films